Cheng Andong (born October 1936) is a Chinese politician who served as governor of Shaanxi from 1994 to 2002. He spent 10 years working at Gaokeng Coal Mine in Pingxiang before serving in various administrative and political roles in Pingxiang Mining Bureau. He joined the Chinese Communist Party (CCP) in June 1980.

He was an alternate member of the 14th Central Committee of the Chinese Communist Party and a member of the 15th Central Committee of the Chinese Communist Party. He was a representative of the 14th and 15th National Congress of the Chinese Communist Party. He was a delegate to the 7th, 8th and 9th National People's Congress. He was a member of the Standing Committee of the 10th Chinese People's Political Consultative Conference.

Biography
Cheng was born in Huainan County (now Huainan), Anhui, in October 1936. He graduated from Fuxin Coal Mine School in 1955 and Hefei University of Technology in 1962.

Starting in September 1955, he successively served as worker, engineer, deputy mine manager, chief engineer, deputy director, and director of Gaokeng Coal Mine and then Pingxiang Mining Bureau. He eventually became deputy party secretary and mayor of Pingxiang. In 1984, he was promoted to become deputy party secretary and mayor of Nanchang, and served until April 1990, when he was appointed assistant governor of Jiangxi.

He was appointed party secretary of Xi'an in September 1990 and was admitted to member of the Standing Committee of the CCP Shaanxi Provincial Committee, the province's top authority. He concurrently served as chairman of Xi'an Municipal People'g Congress from June 1992 to November 1994. In November 1994, he was named acting governor of Shaanxi, confirmed in January 1995. 

In March 2003, he took office as vice chairperson of the Economic Committee of the Chinese People's Political Consultative Conference.

References

1936 births
Living people
People from Huainan
Hefei University of Technology alumni
Governors of Shaanxi
People's Republic of China politicians from Shaanxi
Chinese Communist Party politicians from Shaanxi
Alternate members of the 14th Central Committee of the Chinese Communist Party
Members of the 15th Central Committee of the Chinese Communist Party
Delegates to the 7th National People's Congress
Delegates to the 8th National People's Congress
Delegates to the 9th National People's Congress
Members of the Standing Committee of the 10th Chinese People's Political Consultative Conference
Communist Party secretaries of Xi'an